DataTreasury, located in Plano, Texas, United States, develops, acquires and licenses technology for secure check image capture and storage.  As of 2010 the company had 2 employees, about 1000 shareholders and had generated over $350 million in licensing revenue in the previous four years.

The company has a patent portfolio relating to these technologies, which it enforces. Several banks have settled, and in 2010 U.S. Bank, Viewpointe (a company set up by some major banks and I.B.M. to store and retrieve digital images of checks for large banks) Clearing House Payments Company and its subsidiary, SVPCo, were found guilty of infringing DataTreasury's patents.

There has been controversy concerning the company. In 2004, The New York Times characterized DataTreasury as "a company whose only business, other than one client, appears to be suing other companies." The banking industry has accused DataTreasury's lawyers of patent trolling and DataTreasury themselves of abusing the patent system by buying the patents they are enforcing. The US Senate version of the Patent Reform Act of 2007 (which was never enacted) contained an amendment, lobbied for by banks, tailored to protect banks from DataTreasury infringement litigation.  On the other hand, in 2010, just after DataTreasury won their first lawsuit, Claudio Ballard, who founded the company, was named inventor of the year.

Company foundation and early years
Claudio Ballard founded DataTreasury in 1998 in Melville, New York, to market technology that processes electronic checks and other documents and related payment-processing tools utilizing patents prosecuted and filed prior to DataTreasury's founding.  Patents were issued in 1999 and 2000.

According to Ballard, DataTreasury had as many as 100 employees, but almost went out of business in late 2001.

In 2002, DataTreasury licensed their first imaging system, eImageVault, to Bank Hapoalim of Israel.

According to a 2010 article in the Minneapolis Star Tribune, DataTreasury said that in its early days, "DataTreasury discussed a joint venture with Chase Manhattan Bank, now known as JPMorgan Chase. But according to the company, JPMorgan Chase instead helped start up competitors, Small Value Payments Co. (SVPCO) and Viewpointe Archive Services, which now process most of the nation's checks."

Patent infringement suits

Ballard patents
In 2002, DataTreasury sued 56 banks and other companies, including JPMorgan Chase and First Data, for infringing the Ballard patents. 

In 2003, the U.S. Congress passed the Check Clearing for the 21st Century Act, known as "Check 21". The act allows banks to take digital images of checks, exchange those images with other banks, and destroy the original paper copies.

By December 2004, two companies that DataTreasury had sued had settled.  Affiliated Computer Services, a large information technology supplier, paid $50,000, and the RDM Corporation, a small Canadian company that sells hardware and software for payment processing, agreed to "pay a fee for each check imaging terminal it deploys and 'a per-click royalty for storage of electronic documents and check information, calculated at around a 50 percent royalty rate,'" according to a DataTreasury press release reported by The New York Times.  In mid-2005, JPMorgan Chase settled their suit. The pending suits were put on hold pending the outcome of a reexamination of the patents (see below), but after the USPTO confirmed the validity of the patents, the cases moved forward.

The company relocated to Plano, Texas, in October 2005.

In November 2005, First Data filed a request for a reexamination of the DataTreasury Ballard patents, citing numerous earlier publications that it claimed either anticipated the DataTreasury inventions or made them obvious.  In 2007, the USPTO upheld both patents and further allowed DataTreasury to claim additional inventions that were disclosed but not claimed in the original applications.

In August 2006, Merrill Lynch and DataTreasury settled their suit.

In 2007, the United States Senate version of the Patent Reform Act of 2007 (S. 1145) moved forward with an amendment to Section 14 of the Act, supported by a number of financial services companies, which would prevent DataTreasury from collecting damages on the patents.  However, the Congressional Budget Office (CBO) predicted that if such a provision were passed, owners of check-processing patents (such as DataTreasury) would sue the federal government, arguing that their property had been unlawfully seized.  The CBO estimated that the suit would have a high likelihood of success and that the government's liability from this lawsuit could reach $1 billion, to cover royalties of 5 cents per check, over the remaining life of the patents.

On March 26, 2010, a jury found that U.S. Bank, Viewpointe, and Clearing House Payments Company and its subsidiary, SVPCo, were guilty of infringing DataTreasury's patents.  The jury entered a decision $26.6 million in damages and found that the infringement was willful.  Because of the willful infringement finding, the trial judge doubled the damages.

WMR e-Pin patents
In February 2006, DataTreasury purchased four patents from WMR e-Pin, LLC.

On February 24, 2006, DataTreasury filed an infringement suit with respect to these patents against 30 banks and other companies in the United States District Court for the Eastern District of Texas.

Settlements
The following banks and corporations have settled their lawsuits with DataTreasury and/or taken a license.

Affiliated Computer Services
Bank of New York Mellon Corp
Bank One
Citibank
City National Corporation
Community Banking Systems
Compass Bancshares Inc.
Diebold
First Data
First Tennessee Bank
Groupe Ingenico
Groupe Ingenico
JP Morgan Chase
Mellon Bank
Merrill Lynch
NCR
NetDeposit
PNC Financial Services
RDM Corp

Other litigation
In April 2011, Ted Doukas sued DataTreasury claiming that he was a financial backer of Claudio Ballard when Ballard was working on the image capture technology and was therefore entitled to one half of the proceeds from the invention.  The total amount sought was $15 billion. Doukas' claim was dismissed against DataTreasury (and its officers and directors) in May 2013. The case is currently pending appeal.

Controversy
Former congressman Steve Bartlett, president of the Financial Services Roundtable, said that DataTreasury's lawsuits are "an example of what's wrong with patent law." Stephen Boyd, a spokesman for Senator Jeff Sessions who supported an amendment to shift the potential liability from the banks to taxpayers, characterized the company's lawyers as patent trolls. DataTreasury has stated that Ballard is the inventor of the system and built the company to sell it before the banks stole the idea and nearly destroyed his business.

References

Patent monetization companies of the United States
Financial services companies of the United States
Companies based in Plano, Texas
Technology companies of the United States
1998 establishments in New York (state)
Companies established in 1998
Financial technology